Božidar Ćosović (1916–1943) was Yugoslav gendarmerie officer, carpenter and driver from Brezova, known as a military officer during the World War II. Ćosović held the rank of self-proclaimed voivode of Pećanac Chetniks and commanded the Javor Detachment. Karchmar described Ćosović as free-booting semi-bandit. Vladimir Dedijer referred to him as village bully. Ćosović was given a title of voivode by Kosta Pećanac who named a group of irregulars as Javor Chetnik Detachment. Many sources say that he was self-proclaimed voivode.

On 11 July 1941 Ćosović robbed and killed a group of 5 Muslims in Crvena Gora near Ivanjica. In August 1941 Ćosović and Đura Smederevac for a short time joined their detachments with forces of voivode Đekić to establish Zlatibor Detachment of 160 men. On 28 August they attacked Ustaše controlled stronghold in Štitkovo, killed two members of Croatian Home Guard and captured and destroyed their stronghold. Subsequently, they split their forces and retreated. Ćosović and his Javor Detachment retreated to Moravički district and captured Ivanjica on 31 August after it was first deserted by Germans. In mid-October Ćosović captured Arilje and Ivanjica. On 5th November of September, Chetniks under Ćosović killed 16 Muslims, including minors. Few of the victims were tortured before liquidation.

Ćosović, a self-proclaimed Chetnik voivode and ex gendarmerie officer, tried to secure retreat of Germans and their arms from Užice. Ćosović again attacked Ivanjica during the night between 1 and 2 November 1941.

At the end of 1941 Ćosović also legalized the Javor Chetnik Detachment under his command which was renamed to Javor Independent Chetnik Detachment with code C-37. Since he disobeyed his detachment was disbanded but he kept his arms and became illegal and had numerous military conflicts with Italian and German forces and Sandžak Muslim militia.

During the night between 14 and 15 October 1942 Ćosović and his Javor detachment of legalized Chetniks attacked German post and antimony mine in Lisa near Ivanjica.

Zvonko Vučković had very negative opinion about Ćosović and described how he disobeyed orders and conducted many acts of violence and robbery, so in 1943 Draža Mihailović liquidated both Ćosović and his associate Radomir Đekić.

References

Sources 

 
 
 
 
 
 
 

1916 births
1943 deaths
Executed Serbian collaborators with Nazi Germany
Pećanac Chetniks
Serbian people executed by Nazi Germany